Chaerocina zomba is a moth of the family Sphingidae that is endemic to Malawi.

References

zomba
Moths described in 2006
Endemic fauna of Malawi
Moths of Africa